Korea Women's Hot Line is a non-profit women's rights activist group, protecting women's rights from all kinds of violence and advancing women's social position as well as establishing gender equality in the spheres of family, work, and society. In politics, economics, society, and culture, KWHL's purpose is to make women participate actively, thus contributing to this land's peace and democracy.

Contrary to its name, KWHL is not an emergency call center, but a women's movement organization whose biggest issues are eradicating domestic and sexual violence. KWHL was established in 1983, in the beginning of the women's movement in South Korea, and now has 26 local branches located throughout the country. KWHL oversees counseling centers and shelters for survivors of domestic violence as well as producing films, lobbying and holding symposiums and demonstrations. KWHL is a member of the Korean Women's Associations United.

One of KWHL's largest programs is the International Solidarity Program, which networks with other women's NGOs all over NGO, particularly in women's rights and domestic violence. The Asian Women's Network's third International Symposium ("State Responsibility to Combat Domestic Violence and the Role of the Women's Rights Movement") will be hosted by KWHL here in Korea in September 2008.

KWHL publishes an English newsletter every year, titled "Through Women's Eyes."

KWHL also holds a film festival in Seoul every year to showcase international and domestic films regarding women's rights and struggles.  The festival is called the Korea Women's Film Festival (FIWOM).

References

External links
 

Women's organizations based in South Korea
Women's rights organizations